Edison Misla Aldarondo (August 29, 1942 - 30 November 2021) was a Puerto Rican Republican politician who served as the Speaker of the Puerto Rican House of Representatives from 1997 to 2001. He was a founder of the  pro-statehood New Progressive Party of Puerto Rico (NPP). He had also served as Representative from the 4th District (San Juan) from 1977 to 2002, and as Chairman of the San Juan NPP Municipal Committee from 1998 to 1999.

Resignation 
In 2001, he resigned his position in the House and was accused of extortion, money laundering and witness tampering in connection with financing a local hospital.

Rape 
In 2002, he was charged with rape of the 17-year-old friend of his step-daughter to whom he had given alcohol and prescription drugs. Under questioning, his step-daughter claimed that he had also been molesting her for eight years. He was convicted of sexual abuse of a minor, and sentenced to 13 years in prison.

Corruption conviction 
In 2004, he was also convicted on fifteen charges of corruption, and sentenced to nine years in prison.  In 2015, Misla Aldarondo was released from prison to complete the rest of his sentence in house arrest.

Death 
Edison Misla Aldarondo died on November 30, 2021, as a result of a heart attack. He was buried at Cementerio Los Cipreses in Bayamón, Puerto Rico.

See also

 Crime in Puerto Rico

References

|-

|-

Speakers of the House of Representatives of Puerto Rico
New Progressive Party members of the House of Representatives of Puerto Rico
People from Isabela, Puerto Rico
Political commentators
Politicians convicted of extortion under color of official right
Puerto Rico politicians convicted of crimes
Puerto Rican rapists
Republican Party (Puerto Rico) politicians
University of Puerto Rico alumni
Politicians convicted of sex offences
People convicted of child sexual abuse
1942 births
2021 deaths